The Katepurna Dam is an earthfill dam on the Katepurna River situated at Mahan, near Barshi Takali, Akola district, in the state of Maharashtra in India. It serves the city of Akola and the surrounding suburbs.it provides water to over 8lakh citizens of Akola and 69 surrounding villages

Specifications

Purpose
 Irrigation
 Water Supply

See also
 Dams in Maharashtra
 List of reservoirs and dams in India

References

Dams in Akola district
Dams completed in 1974
1974 establishments in Maharashtra